90 Day Fiancé: Happily Ever After? is an American reality television series on TLC.

Series overview

Episodes

Season 1 (2016)

Season 2 (2017)

Season 3 (2018)

Season 4 (2019)

Season 5 (2020)

Season 6 (2021)

Season 7 (2022–23)

References

External links
 

Lists of American reality television series episodes